Limoges Conservatory or Conservatoire à rayonnement régional de Limoges is a musical conservatory in Limoges, France. As of 2012 it had an enrollment of 2000 students and 79 teachers.

References

Music schools in France
Buildings and structures in Limoges
Dance schools in France